Avantage (foaled 27 September 2015) is an Australian-bred, New Zealand-trained Thoroughbred racehorse who has won nine Group 1 races.

Avantage was bred by Willie Calder and Karen N Calder.  She was purchased by David Ellis at the 2017 National Yearling Sales Series for $210,000 from The Oaks Stud.  

She has been raced by the Te Akau Avantage Syndicate, managed by Karen Fenton-Ellis.  Her usual riders have been Danielle Johnson and Opie Bosson.

In March 2019 Avantage won the Group 3 Birthday Card Stakes over 1200m at Rosehill
and followed that with a third in the 1200m Group 2 Arrowfield 3YO Sprint behind Classique Legend and Jonker.
  
Later in September 2019 she raced twice more in Australian group company.  She was 7th over 1400m at Randwick Racecourse and 8th over 1500m at Rosehill behind Kolding and Mister Sea Wolf respectively. 

As well as her New Zealand Group wins she has also been placed second behind Melody Belle in the 2021 Bonecrusher New Zealand Stakes (2000m), 2020 Livamol Classic (2040m) and Windsor Park Plate (1600m).

Avantage was retired from racing on 17 September 2021 after suffering a tendon injury.

Breeding career

Avantage was purchased for $4.1 million by Coolmore Stud via New Zealand Bloodstock’s online sale.  The purchase established a new world record price for any horse sold online.  In her first year she was serviced by stallion Wootton Basset.

Pedigree

References 

New Zealand racehorses
Racehorses bred in Australia
Racehorses trained in New Zealand
2015 racehorse births
Thoroughbred family 27-a